Arnór Gunnarsson (born 25 April 1971) is an Icelandic alpine skier. He competed in the men's slalom at the 1998 Winter Olympics.

References

External links
 

1971 births
Living people
Arnor Gunnarsson
Arnor Gunnarsson
Alpine skiers at the 1998 Winter Olympics
Arnor Gunnarsson
20th-century Icelandic people